Gurbachan Singh Babbehali is an Indian politician and belongs to the ruling Shiromani Akali Dal. He is a member of Punjab Legislative Assembly and represents Gurdaspur.

Family and Education
His father's name is Moninder Singh.

Political career
He was elected to the Punjab Legislative Assembly in 2007 from Gurdaspur. He was re-elected in 2012. He is Chief Parliamentary Secretary in the current Punjab Government.

Electoral performance

References

Living people
Shiromani Akali Dal politicians
Indian Sikhs
Punjab, India MLAs 2007–2012
Punjab, India MLAs 2012–2017
Year of birth missing (living people)
People from Gurdaspur district
Place of birth missing (living people)